The Anatolian Bulgarians or Bulgarians of Asia Minor (maloazijski bǎlgari, or shortly, малоазианци, maloazianci) were members of the Bulgarian Orthodox Church who settled in Ottoman-ruled northwestern Anatolia (today in Turkey), possibly in the 18th century, and remained there until 1914.

The main area of settlement lay to the south of the Sea of Marmara between Çanakkale, Balıkesir and Bursa

The existence of Bulgarian villages in Anatolia was noted by western travellers such as the Italian Dr Salvatori (1807), the Frenchman J.M. Tancoigne and the Briton George Keppel (1829). Tancoigne describes his experience in Kız-Dervent (located farther east, between İzmit and İznik) as follows:

The Bulgarian presence in northwestern Anatolia was studied in more detail by the ethnographer Vasil Kanchov who visited the area in the late 19th century. According to his data, there were 20 Bulgarian villages in Anatolia, for each of which he provided the number of Bulgarian houses. In Kız-Dervent, there were 400 Bulgarian houses, in Kocabunar — 350, in Söğüt — 60, in Kubaş — 100, in Toybelen — 50, in Yeniköy (Ново село, Novo selo) — 150, in Mandır — 150, in Alacabayır — 50, in Killik (also Ikinlik) — 50, in Simavla — 40, in Hacıpaunköy — 80, in Manata — 100, in Bayramiç — 30 (minority), in Stengelköy — 60, in Çataltaş (also Çataltepe) — 70, in Urumçe — 40, as well as an unknown number in Çaltık, Trama and Mata.

The 1897 research of L. Iv. Dorosiev, partially based on data by his brother Yakim, a tailor in Balıkesir, lists 16 Bulgarian-inhabited villages, as follows: Kocabunar — 245 houses with 1,485 people, Söğüt — 65 houses with 440 people, Novo selo (also Yeniköy, Kızılcılar) — 65 houses with 425 people, Killik — 35 houses with 212 people, Toybelen — 125 houses with 712 people, Alacabair — 55 houses with 308 people, Taşkesi — 35 houses with 252 people, Mandır — 145 houses with 940 people, Hacıpaunköy — 60 houses with 344 people, Üren — 15 houses with 95 people, Kubaş — 20 houses with 115 people, Stengelköy — 55 houses with 312 people, Çataltepe — 80 houses, Urumçe — 45 houses, Yeniköy — 35 houses, as well as 50 houses in the town of Gönen. This makes a total of around 6,720 people.

After the Liberation of Bulgaria, many Anatolian Bulgarians returned to their native land, with some settling in Yagnilo and Dobroplodno, Varna Province, Svirachi, Oreshino, Byalopolyane, Ivaylovgrad in Haskovo Province exchanging their property with that of Turks from Bulgaria. In 1914, following the Balkan Wars, the vast majority of the Anatolian Bulgarians were deported to Bulgaria, leaving their property behind. According to Index Anatolicus near Mihaliç (today Karacabey), there is also Bulgarlar village.

See also
Asia Minor Slavs

References

 
 

European diaspora in Turkey
Ottoman period in the history of Bulgaria
Bulgarian diaspora
History of Turkey
Bulgarians from the Ottoman Empire
Demographics of the Ottoman Empire
Bulgarian people by ethnographic region